Jon Aukrust Osmoen  (born 1992) is a Norwegian orienteering competitor. He was born in Os, Hedmark. He won a bronze medal in the relay at the 2012 Junior World Orienteering Championships in Košice with the Norwegian team. He competed at the 2018 World Orienteering Championships in Latvia, where he qualified for the sprint final but placed 30th.

References

Norwegian orienteers
Male orienteers
1992 births
Living people
People from Os, Innlandet
Competitors at the 2017 World Games
Sportspeople from Innlandet
Junior World Orienteering Championships medalists